Rashida Hamid is a Bangladeshi teacher, public figure, and current First Lady of Bangladesh. She is the wife of the President Abdul Hamid. She has been serving as a country's First Lady since 14 March 2013.

Early life
Rashida Hamid was born in Jaffarabad, Karimganj, Kishoreganj. She is the wife of former Speaker of the Jatiya Sangsad and current President Abdul Hamid and mother of Rejwan Ahammad Taufiq, MP.

Education
Hamid passed SSC from SV Government High School in 1963 and HSC from Gurudayal Government College. She graduated from Gurudayal Government College in 1972.

Work
Rashida Hamid worked as Headteacher in a Kindergarten School, Dhaka. She is the Chairperson of the President Abdul Hamid Medical College and Hospital's governing body.

References

First Ladies of Bangladesh
Living people
Year of birth missing (living people)